The 1897 Paris–Roubaix was the second edition of the Paris–Roubaix, a classic one-day cycle race in France. The single day event was held on 18 April 1897 and stretched  from Paris to its end in a velodrome in Roubaix. The winner was Maurice Garin, an Italian who lived in France.

Results

References

Paris–Roubaix
Paris–Roubaix
Paris–Roubaix
Paris–Roubaix